Elementary calculus may refer to:

 The elementary aspects of differential and integral calculus;
 Elementary Calculus: An Infinitesimal Approach, a textbook by Jerome Keisler.